Malibu U is an American variety show that aired in the summer of 1967 on ABC. The series starred Ricky Nelson, and aired on Friday evenings from 8:30 to 9:00 p.m.

Overview
In the series, Nelson starred as the "Dean of the Drop-Ins" of a fictional college called Malibu U. Regulars included Robie Porter as "President of the Student Body" and the Mali-beauties dancers.

In each episode three well-known performers, called "Visiting Professors," sang. Two of the performers were filmed on the beach, and the third was filmed in another unusual location. On the July 28, 1967 episode Leonard Nimoy sang the novelty song The Ballad of Bilbo Baggins. Other guest stars included Annette Funicello, Don Ho and The Four Seasons with Frankie Valli.

Some of the classes taught at Malibu U were surfing and sunbathing.  A newspaper article stated that the series would "present the new fads, fashions and foibles of the young world."

Episode list
 July 21: guest stars Frankie Valli, Don Ho, Annette Funicello
 July 28: guest stars Leonard Nimoy, Buffalo Springfield, Engelbert Humperdinck, Bobby Rydell, Mrs. Miller
 August 4: guest stars James Darren, Harper's Bizarre, Frankie Randall, The Happenings
 August 11: guest stars The Turtles, Lou Rawls, Lesley Gore, Don and the Goodtimes
 August 18: guest stars John Astin, The 5th Dimension, The Sunshine Company, Roger Williams
 August 25: guest stars The Doors, Marvin Gaye, Chad & Jeremy, Lou Christie
 September 1: guest stars Dionne Warwick, The Breed, Peter and Gordon, Sandy Posey

References

External links

1967 American television series debuts
1967 American television series endings
American Broadcasting Company original programming
1960s American music television series
1960s American variety television series
English-language television shows
Television series by 20th Century Fox Television